Middlebrook is an unincorporated community on the Iron County/St. Francois County line in the U.S. state of Missouri. It is located approximately six miles north of Ironton, four miles east of Belleview, and seven miles southeast of Belgrade and Caledonia.

Middlebrook was laid out in 1856. A post office called Middlebrook was established in 1858.

References

Unincorporated communities in Iron County, Missouri
Unincorporated communities in St. Francois County, Missouri
Unincorporated communities in Missouri